Mechanical banks are small containers with a decorative mechanical action, used to store coins. They were originally intended to promote saving money among children in the mid-19th century. Frequently made of cast iron, mechanical banks were often creatively designed, depicting historical, legendary or everyday events to increase their appeal. Each bank performed a stunt or an action when a coin was dropped into a slot and a lever was pulled. The banks quickly became popular with children and adults alike and soon became a sought-after collector's item.

See also 
 Piggy bank

External links
 Guide to Identifying and Valuing Vintage Mechanical Banks

References

Banks
Coins
Containers
Mechanical toys
Traditional toys